The following is a list of adjectival forms of former regions in English and their demonymic equivalents, which denote the people or the inhabitants of these former regions.

Note: Demonyms are given in plural forms. Singular forms simply remove the final 's' or, in the case of -ese endings, are the same as the plural forms.  
The ending -men has feminine equivalent -women (e.g. an Irishman and a Scotswoman). The French terminations -ois / ais serve as both the singular and plural masculine; adding 'e' ( / ) makes them singular feminine; 'es' ( / ) makes them plural feminine. The Spanish termination "-o" usually denotes the masculine and is normally changed to feminine by dropping the "-o" and adding "-a". The plural forms are usually "-os" and "-as" respectively.

Adjectives ending -ish can be used as collective demonyms (e.g. the English, the Cornish).  So can those ending in -ch / -tch (e.g. the French, the Dutch) provided they are pronounced with a 'ch' sound (e.g. the adjective Czech does not qualify).

Where an adjective is a link, the link is to the language or dialect of the same name. (Reference: Ethnologue, Languages of the World)

Many place-name adjectives and many demonyms refer also to various other things, sometimes with and sometimes without one or more additional words.  (Sometimes, the use of one or more additional words is optional.)  Notable examples are cheeses, cat breeds, dog breeds, and horse breeds.  (See List of words derived from toponyms.)

Where an adjective is a link, the link is to the language or dialect of the same name.

See also

Demonym
List of adjectival and demonymic forms of place names
List of adjectivals and demonyms for astronomical bodies
List of adjectivals and demonyms for continental regions
List of adjectivals and demonyms for subcontinental regions
List of adjectival and demonymic forms for countries and nations
List of adjectivals and demonyms for Australia
List of adjectivals and demonyms for Canada
List of adjectivals and demonyms for India
List of adjectivals and demonyms for Malaysia
List of adjectivals and demonyms for Mexico
List of adjectivals and demonyms for New Zealand
List of adjectivals and demonyms for the Philippines
List of adjectivals and demonyms for the United States
List of adjectivals and demonyms for cities
List of adjectivals and demonyms for former regions
List of adjectivals and demonyms for Greco-Roman antiquity
List of adjectivals and demonyms for fictional regions

Former regions